Flusser may refer to:
 USS Flusser, US ships
 Flusser (surname), Germanic surname